Yordan Petkov (born 11 March 1976 in Veliko Tarnovo) is a former Bulgarian football defender who also used to be assistant coach of Slavia Sofia under Martin Kushev.

As a player, he spent most of his career at Slavia Sofia, with a short spell at Turkish Samsunspor and Cyprus Ermis Aradippou before retirement. In his first years as a footballer, he also played for Etar Veliko Tarnovo, Vorskla Poltava and Lokomotiv Sofia.
On 31 July 2011, Petkov played his farewell game for Slavia, appearing for 10 minutes in the 2:2 draw with Cypriot side Apollon Limassol in an exhibition match.

Petkov was capped four times for Bulgaria.

References

External links 
 

1976 births
Living people
Bulgarian footballers
Bulgaria international footballers
Bulgarian expatriate footballers
Association football defenders
FC Etar Veliko Tarnovo players
FC Vorskla Poltava players
FC Lokomotiv 1929 Sofia players
PFC Slavia Sofia players
Samsunspor footballers
Ermis Aradippou FC players
First Professional Football League (Bulgaria) players
Ukrainian Premier League players
Süper Lig players
Cypriot First Division players
Expatriate footballers in Ukraine
Expatriate footballers in Turkey
Expatriate footballers in Cyprus
People from Veliko Tarnovo
Sportspeople from Veliko Tarnovo Province